Agaclytus may refer to:

 Agaclytus (freedman) (2nd century), freedman of Roman Emperor Marcus Aurelius
 Lucius Aurelius Agaclytus (2nd century), son of the freedman and second husband of Vibia Aurelia Sabina
 Agaclytus, author of a lost work about Olympia, Greece; see 

Ancient Roman praenomina